Waylander are a Northern Irish folk metal band influential in the realms of Celtic metal. Formed in 1993, the band blends traditional Irish folk with 1990s heavy metal.

Biography
Formed in 1993, Waylander released their debut demo, Once Upon an Era, in early 1995, mixing Irish folk music with extreme metal. Waylander were soon dubbed folk, Celtic and pagan metal. In 1996, with the addition of a full-time tin whistle player, Waylander released their second demo, Dawning of a New Age, which soon gained the band a prominent position in the folk metal scene. This was cemented when Waylander signed to Century Media Records, and in 1998 their debut album was released, entitled Reawakening Pride Once Lost. A handful of gigs were undertaken to promote this album but label problems and internal strife blunted the potential somewhat. After overcoming some line-up changes, Waylander signed with Blackend Records and released their The Light, the Dark and the Endless Knot album in early 2001. Again internal strife reared up, culminating in numerous line-up changes for several years. Despite this Waylander managed to perform some notable gigs, including the Bloodstock and Day of Darkness festivals, as well as gigs with Ancient Rites, Cathedral, Sabbat and Skyforger. In 2005, joining original members ArdChieftain O' Hagan, Michael Proctor, and Den Ferran were Saul McMichael and Gareth Murdock on guitars.

Waylander have inked a deal with Listenable Records and Waylander's new third album, entitled Honour Amongst Chaos, is "more powerful and beautiful than ever, using a vast array of Irish folk instruments and armed with their passion for metal in its truest form", according to a press release. "Blending epic atmospheres and relentless brutality, Honour Amongst Chaos reflects the heart and soul of pagan warriors worldwide."  Waylander's debut album, Reawakening Pride Once Lost, has been re-released by Midhir Records on CD and vinyl.

In 2009, Gareth Murdock left the band to be the new bassist for Alestorm.

Discography

Studio albums
 Reawakening Pride Once Lost (1998)
 The Light, the Dark and the Endless Knot (2001)
 Honour Amongst Chaos (2008)
 Kindred Spirits (2012)
 Ériú's Wheel (2019)

Demo albums
 Once Upon an Era (1994)
 Dawning of a New Age (1996)

Members

Current members
Ciaran O'Hagan – vocals 
Saul McMichael – guitars 
Dave Briggs – tin whistle, Irish bouzouki, mandolin, bodhrán 
Tor Dennison – guitars 
Lee McCartney – drums 
Murzo McMurzo – bass

Former Members
Den Ferren – drums 
Jason Barriskill – bass 
Baylers – guitars 
Peter Boylan – guitars 
Dermot O'Hagan – guitars 
Michael Proctor – bass 
Máirtín Mac Cormaic – tin whistle, bodhrán 
Bo Murphy – drums 
Owen Bowden – guitars 
Nick Shannon – drums 
Kevin Canavan – guitars 
Fearghal Duffy – guitars 
Alan Connolly – guitars 
Gareth Murdock – guitars 
Ade Mulgrew – guitars 
Hugh O'Neill – guitars 
Steve Reynolds – bass 

Timeline

References

External links

 
 Official MySpace

Heavy metal musical groups from Northern Ireland
Celtic metal musical groups
British black metal musical groups
British folk metal musical groups
Musical groups established in 1993
Listenable Records artists
Century Media Records artists